The 1975–76 La Liga was the 45th season since its establishment. The season started on 6 September 1975 and finished on 16 May 1976.

Team locations

League table

Results table

Pichichi Trophy

References 
 La Liga 1975/1976
 Primera División 1975/76
 List of La Liga Champions

External links 
  Official LFP Site

La Liga seasons
1975–76 in Spanish football leagues
Spain